Tirio language may refer to:

Tirió language (Brazil)
Tirio language (New Guinea) (New Guinea)

See also 
 Tirio languages, a family of Trans–New Guinea languages